is a Japanese actor.

Filmography

Television

Film

Video on demand

References

External links
 Agent profile 
 

1992 births
Living people
21st-century Japanese male actors